Pasindu Isira is a Sri Lankan cricketer. He made his List A debut for Kegalle District in the 2016–17 Districts One Day Tournament on 23 March 2017.

References

External links
 

Year of birth missing (living people)
Living people
Sri Lankan cricketers
Kegalle District cricketers
Place of birth missing (living people)